Each winner of the 1976 Governor General's Awards for Literary Merit was selected by a panel of judges administered by the Canada Council for the Arts.

Winners

English Language
Fiction: Marian Engel, Bear.
Poetry or Drama: Joe Rosenblatt, Top Soil.
Non-Fiction: Carl Berger, The Writing of Canadian History.

French Language
Fiction: André Major, Les rescapés.
Poetry or Drama: Alphonse Piché, Poèmes 1946-1968.
Non-Fiction: Fernand Ouellette, Le Bas Canada 1791-1840, changements structuraux et crise.

Governor General's Awards
Governor General's Awards
1976 literary awards